FK Zibens/Zemessardze (before 2007 – Dinaburg-Zemessardze) is a former Latvian football team from the town of Ilūkste.

History and former names
 Dilar Ilūkste
 FK Ilūkste
 Celtnieks Ilūkste ("Builder Ilūkste")
 FK Zibens/Zemessardze
 Dinaburg-Zemessardze

Before the 2006 season FK Zibens/Zemessardze merged with Dinaburg FC Reserves to become Dinaburg-Zemessardze.

In 2007 players from the Virslīga could not play in 1. līga because the team changed its name from Dinaburg-Zemessardze to FK Zibens/Zemessardze. The club's last participation in Latvian football competitions was in 2008 when it placed 8th in the Latvian First League. The club was dissolved in 2009.

Honours
 Latvijas 2.līga Winner
 1998

Participation in Latvian Championships
 2008 –
 2007 – 9th (1. līga)
 2006 – 6th (1. līga)
 2005 – Dinaburg-2 withdrew after playing nine matches, which were annulled (1. līga)
 1992 – 12th (relegated)
 1991 – 7th

References

Sport in Ilūkste
Zibens Zemessardze
Association football clubs established in 1998
Association football clubs disestablished in 2009
1998 establishments in Latvia
2009 disestablishments in Latvia